Charles Pilsworth (died 1749) was a British politician. He was Member of Parliament for Aylesbury from 1741 to 1747.

Personal background 
Pilsworth married Parnell Tyringham and resided in the manor of Lower Winchendon, which she held as co-heiress, along with her sister Mary, at the time of the 1735 death of her brother Lord Francis Tyrington.

References 

Members of the Parliament of Great Britain for English constituencies
1735 deaths
British MPs 1741–1747
Year of birth unknown
People from Buckinghamshire